Sullivan Hall (also known as the Law Building) is a building on the Seattle University campus, in the U.S. state of Washington. The building houses the Seattle University School of Law.

Designed by Olson/Sundberg, the 135,000 square foot building was completed in August 1999 and cost approximately $21 million.

References

External links

 

Buildings and structures in Seattle
Seattle University campus